"Can't Get It Back" is a song by American recording group Blaque. It was written by Salaam Remi, Marlon Williams, and Hernst "StayBent" Bellevue, and band member Natina Reed for the group's second album, Blaque Out (2002). Production was helmed by Remi with co-production from Bellevue. The song samples from the song "We're Going to a Party" (1977) by American R&B singer Evelyn "Champagne" King. Due to the inclusion of the sample, Aubrey Gravatt, Joseph Freeman, and Theodore Life are also credited as songwriters. "Can't Get It Back" was released as the first single on October 16, 2001 in the United States where it peaked at 91 on Billboards Hot R&B/Hip-Hop Songs chart. With Blaque Out eventually being shelved, "Can't Get It Back" was later re-recorded, remixed, and released by British girl group Mis-Teeq in 2003.

Music video
A music video for the song was shot in Los Angeles, California, and directed by Liz Friedlander. The video was set to feature the girls dancing in separate apartments, throwing tantrums where they ripped pictures and discarded memories of their love interests. Due to undisclosed reasons, Columbia Records shelved the video; in 2010, a 30-second clip of the cancelled video leaked via YouTube.

Remixes
A Trackmasters remix, produced by Poke and Tone, featuring Royce da 5'9", was included on the trio's promo vinyl pressing of the single. The remix was also featured on the 2007 and 2011 iTunes versions of Blaque Out.

Track listings
All tracks written by Salaam Remi, Marlon Williams, Hernst Bellevue, Aubrey Gravatt, Joseph Freeman, Theodore Life, and Natina Reed.

Notes
  denotes co-producer
Sample credits
 "Can't Get It Back" contains excerpts from "We're Going to a Party" (1977) as performed by Evelyn "Champagne" King.

Personnel and credits 
Credits adapted from the liner notes of Blaque Out.

 Hernst "StayBent" Bellevue – co-producer, keyboards, writer 
 Shamari Fears – vocals
 Joseph Freeman – writer (sample)
 Aubrey Gravatt – writer (sample)
 Theodore Life – writer (sample)

 Gary Noble – mixing engineer
 Chris Gehringer – mastering engineer
 Natina Reed – vocals, writer
 Salaam Remi – arranger, producer, writer 
 Brandi Williams – vocals

Charts

Release history

Mis-Teeq version

In 2002, Mis-Teeq re-recorded "Can't Get It Back" for their second album Eye Candy (2003), including a modified introduction and a re-written bridge, written and performed by the group's member Alesha Dixon. The single was the group's seventh consecutive top-10 hit, peaking at number 8 on the UK Singles Chart. When it came to "Scandalous"'s follow-up release in June 2003, the group and their label Telstar Records decided to use a remixed version of "Can't Get It Back" as the official single version and instead the Ignorantz Remix was included in the video.

Track listings

Notes
  denotes co-producer
  denotes additional producer
Sample credits
 "Can't Get It Back (Album Version)" samples from "We're Going to a Party" (1977) as performed by Evelyn "Champagne" King.

Personnel and credits 
Credits adapted from the liner notes of Eye Candy.

 Hernst "StayBent" Bellevue – co-producer, keyboards, writer 
 Alesha Dixon – vocals, writer
 Joseph Freeman – writer (sample)
 Aubrey Gravatt – writer (sample)
 Angela Hunte – vocal producer
 Theodore Life – writer (sample)

 Marley Marl  – drum programming
 Su-Elise Nash – vocals
 Gary Noble – engineer
 Salaam Remi – arranger, producer, writer 
 Sabrina Washington – vocals
 Marlon Williams – writer

Charts

Release history

References

2001 songs
2001 singles
2003 singles
Blaque songs
Mis-Teeq songs
Music videos directed by Liz Friedlander
Songs written by Salaam Remi
Song recordings produced by Salaam Remi
Columbia Records singles
Telstar Records singles
Reprise Records singles